Blue Heaven is a milkshake and topping flavour sold primarily in Australia. It is blue in colour, and its taste is a mix of vanilla and raspberry. 

Also sold by Bulla in Australia as a limited edition chocolate coated crunch ice cream since July 2018.

While the origins of the flavour itself are unclear, the blue heaven colour, brilliant blue FCF, was first created in 1929. It is thought that the name of the flavour may have originated in the 1928 song, My Blue Heaven, coinciding with the creation of the colour – however there is lacking evidence of the milkshake's presence on menus around Australia at the time. Others theorise it might have been first made in the 1950s, sometime after the release of 1950 film My Blue Heaven starring Betty Grable.

In 2021, Big M released a limited time Blue Heaven flavoured milk as voted by customers.

References

Australian condiments
Australian desserts
Australian drinks
Raspberry